Ludovic Bruckstein (27 July 1920 - 4 August 1988) was a Romanian writer.

He was born in Mukachevo, Czechoslovakia (now Ukraine), and grew up in Sighet, Maramureș, in the northern region of Transylvania.

He was the son of Mordechai Bruckstein, the owner of a small factory making walking canes, and exporting medicinal plants. His great-grandfather, Chaim-Josef Bruckstein, a Hassidic rabbi was among the first chassidim.

In Spring 1944, after a few months in the Sighet ghetto, the Bruckstein family, father, mother and four children, were deported to Auschwitz, as were all of the town's Jews. Only Bruckstein and his younger brother, Israel, survived.

References

1920 births
1988 deaths
Romanian writers
Czechoslovak emigrants to Romania